Apionichthys menezesi is a species of sole in the family Achiridae. It was described by Robson Tamar da Costa Ramos in 2003. It inhabits the Amazon, Negro, Napo and Orinoco rivers.

References

Pleuronectiformes
Taxa named by Robson Tamar da Costa Ramos
Fish described in 2003